Ruda Łańcucka is a village in the administrative district of Gmina Nowa Sarzyna, within Leżajsk County, Subcarpathian Voivodeship, in south-eastern Poland.

The village has a population of 823.

Notable people
Stanisław Tołpa

References

Villages in Leżajsk County